Edwin Randolph Brown (August 29, 1943, in Leesburg, Florida – April 13, 1998 in Maitland, Florida) was a professional baseball player who played two seasons for the California Angels of Major League Baseball.

References

1943 births
1998 deaths
Major League Baseball catchers
California Angels players
Hawaii Islanders players
El Paso Sun Kings players
Idaho Falls Angels players
Batavia Trojans players
Quad Cities Angels players
Arkansas Travelers players
Rochester Red Wings players
Tidewater Tides players
Tulsa Oilers (baseball) players
San Jose Bees players
Baseball players from Florida
Florida State Seminoles baseball players
People from Leesburg, Florida
People from Maitland, Florida